Shibis District is a district of the southeastern Banaadir region of Somalia. One of the oldest districts in Mogadishu, it is bordered by Karan District, Yaqshid District, Bondhere District and Abdiaziz District.

Of the many notable places in Shibis are: NSS headquarters, Saudi Arabia embassy, the house of late Siad Barre, Global Hotel and others.

References

Districts of Somalia
Administrative map of Shibis District

Districts of Somalia
Banaadir